Robert Cox may refer to:

Politicians
 Robert O. Cox (1917–2013), American politician, mayor of Fort Lauderdale, Florida, 1988–1991
 Robert Cox (Canadian politician) (1850–1934), former merchant and politician in Prince Edward Island, Canada
 Robert Cox (Florida politician) (b. 1827/8), member of the Florida House of Representatives
 Robert Cox (Scottish politician) (1845–1899), Scottish politician, Member of Parliament for Edinburgh South, 1895–1899
 Robert Cox (Michigan politician), member of the Michigan House of Representatives
 Bob Cox (politician), Canadian politician, 1977 Ontario general election
 Bobby Cox (politician) (born 1980), American politician, member of the South Carolina House of Representatives

Sports
 Bob Cox (ice hockey) (born 1941), Canadian professional ice hockey player
 Bobby Cox (born 1941), American baseball manager and player
 Bobby Cox (footballer) (1934–2010), Scottish footballer

Others
 Robert E. Cox (1917–1989), American optician and telescope maker
 Robert Edward Cox (1876–1937), American Medal of Honor recipient
 Robert M. Cox (1845–1932), American Medal of Honor recipient
 Robert W. Cox (1926–2018), Canadian international relations scholar
 Robert Cox (actor) (died 1655), English actor
 Robert Cox (anti-Sabbatarian) (1810–1872), Scottish lawyer, known as a writer on the Christian Sabbath, and phrenologist
 Robert Cox (journalist) (born 1933), British journalist, editor of the Buenos Aires Herald
 Robert H. Cox, American physiologist
 Doc Cox (Robert Cox, born 1946), British musician and former television journalist

See also
 Robert Cox Cup, trophy awarded annually by the United States Golf Association for the United States Women's Amateur Golf Championship
 Robert Cox Clifton (1810–1861), English churchman, Canon of Manchester
 Robert Cocks (disambiguation)